Roberto "Robbie" Andres Peralta (born March 14, 1986) is an American mixed martial artist who most recently competed in the Featherweight division. A professional competitor since 2006, he has competed for the UFC, the World Series of Fighting, Strikeforce, and Bellator.

Background
Peralta grew up in Escondido, California, and trained taekwondo from the age of five to twelve.

Mixed martial arts career

Early career
Peralta made his professional MMA debut in March 2007. He lost his debut by submission, but quickly amassed a record of 13 wins and 3 losses over the next few years. A majority of his fights have been in the California-based independent promotion Gladiator Challenge.

Strikeforce
In April 2011, Peralta made his Strikeforce debut by upsetting current DREAM featherweight champion Hiroyuki Takaya at Strikeforce: Diaz vs. Daley via split decision.

Ultimate Fighting Championship
In early September 2011, Peralta signed with the UFC to replace Mackens Semerzier against Mike Lullo at UFC Fight Night: Shields vs. Ellenberger.  He won the fight via unanimous decision.

Peralta defeated Mackens Semerzier on November 12, 2011, at UFC on Fox 1. It was officially recorded as a TKO victory for Peralta though replays later showed that an accidental headbutt dropped Semerzier and allowed Peralta to flurry and earn the stoppage. The fight was later ruled a no contest by the California State Athletic Commission.

Peralta was linked to a bout with Charles Oliveira on January 20, 2012, at UFC on FX 1.  However, UFC officials scrapped the bout.

A rematch with Semerzier was expected to take place on March 3, 2012, at UFC on FX 2.  However, Peralta was forced out of the bout with a toe injury and replaced by Daniel Pineda.

Peralta fought Jason Young on September 29, 2012, at UFC on Fuel TV 5. Peralta won the fight via KO 23 seconds into the first round.

A bout with Akira Corassani, previously linked to UFC 156, was moved April 6, 2013, at UFC on Fuel TV 9, after an illness sidelined Corassani for a time. Peralta lost to Corassani via decision after three rounds. Peralta was suspended for six months after the fight for failing the post fight drug test and testing positive for marijuana.

Peralta faced Estevan Payan on December 28, 2013, at UFC 168. After a back-and-forth first two rounds, Peralta won via knockout early into the third round.

Peralta faced Rony Jason on May 31, 2014, at The Ultimate Fighter Brazil 3 Finale. He won the back-and-forth fight via split decision.

Peralta faced Thiago Tavares on August 16, 2014, at UFC Fight Night 47. He lost the fight via submission in the first round.

Peralta faced Clay Guida on April 4, 2015, at UFC Fight Night 63. He lost the fight by unanimous decision and was subsequently released from the promotion.

Post-UFC career
After being released from the UFC, Peralta signed with World Series of Fighting and made his promotional debut at WSOF 26 on December 18, 2015. He lost the bout via second-round technical knockout.

He then faced Alan Omer at Brave CF 4 on March 31, 2017. He lost the bout via third-round submission.

Peralta then headlined California Cage Wars 1 event against Shad Smith on September 3, 2017. He won the bout via unanimous decision.

Peralta was scheduled to face Aaron Wetherspoon at KOTC: Under Siege on May 4, 2018. However, the bout was cancelled due to an unknown reason.

He then signed with Bellator MMA and faced Juan Archuleta at Bellator 201 on June 29, 2018. He lost the fight via third-round knockout.

Bare-knuckle boxing
After his sole bout in Bellator, Peralta took a bare-knuckle bout at a WBKFF event against Jay Cucciniello on November 9, 2018. He won the bout via unanimous decision.

He then signed with BKFC and made his promotional debut against Peter Petties at BKFC Fight Night: Tampa on December 9, 2021. He won the bout via unanimous decision.

Personal life
Peralta has three daughters.

Championships and accomplishments
Gladiator Challenge
Gladiator Challenge Flyweight Championship (one time; former)
One successful title defense
Gladiator Challenge Featherweight Championship (one time; former)
One successful title defense

Mixed martial arts record

|-
|Loss
|align=center|19–9 (1)
|Juan Archuleta
|KO (punches)
|Bellator 201
|
|align=center| 3
|align=center| 0:14
|Temecula, California, United States
|
|-
|Win
|align=center|19–8 (1)
|Shad Smith
|Decision (unanimous)
|CCW 1: Peralta vs. Smith
|
|align=center|3
|align=center|5:00
|Valley Center, California, United States
|
|-
|Loss
|align=center|18–8 (1)
|Alan Omer
|Submission (rear naked-choke)
|Brave 4: Unstoppable
|
|align=center|3
|align=center|4:44
|Abu Dhabi, United Arab Emirates
|Lightweight bout.
|-
|Loss
|align=center|18–7 (1)
|Sheymon Moraes
|TKO (punches)
|WSOF 26
|
|align=center|2
|align=center|3:21
|Las Vegas, Nevada, United States
|
|-
|Loss
|align=center|18–6 (1)
|Clay Guida
|Decision (unanimous)
|UFC Fight Night: Mendes vs. Lamas
|
|align=center|3
|align=center|5:00
|Fairfax, Virginia, United States
|
|-
|Loss
|align=center|18–5 (1)
|Thiago Tavares
|Submission (rear-naked choke) 
|UFC Fight Night: Bader vs. St. Preux
|
|align=center|1
|align=center|4:27
|Bangor, Maine, United States
|
|-
| Win
|align=center|18–4 (1)
| Rony Jason
| Decision (split)
| The Ultimate Fighter Brazil 3 Finale: Miocic vs. Maldonado
| 
|align=center|3
|align=center|5:00
| São Paulo, Brazil
|
|-
| Win
|align=center|17–4 (1)
| Estevan Payan
| KO (punches)
| UFC 168
| 
|align=center|3
|align=center|0:12
| Las Vegas, Nevada, United States
|
|-
| Loss
|align=center|16–4 (1)
| Akira Corassani
| Decision (unanimous)
| UFC on Fuel TV: Mousasi vs. Latifi
| 
|align=center|3
|align=center|5:00
| Stockholm, Sweden
| 
|-
|  Win
|align=center|16–3 (1)
| Jason Young
| KO (punches)
| UFC on Fuel TV: Struve vs. Miocic
| 
|align=center|1
|align=center|0:23
| Nottingham, England
| 
|-
| NC
|align=center|15–3 (1)
| Mackens Semerzier
| NC (accidental headbutt)
| UFC on Fox: Velasquez vs. Dos Santos
| 
|align=center|3
|align=center|1:54
| Anaheim, California, United States
| 
|-
| Win
|align=center|15–3
| Mike Lullo
| Decision (unanimous)
| UFC Fight Night: Shields vs. Ellenberger
| 
|align=center|3
|align=center|5:00
| New Orleans, Louisiana, United States
| 
|-
| Win
|align=center|14–3
| Hiroyuki Takaya
| Decision (split)
| Strikeforce: Diaz vs. Daley
| 
|align=center|3
|align=center|5:00
| San Diego, California, United States
| 
|-
| Win
|align=center|13–3
| Chris Kirtley
| Submission (triangle choke)
| Gladiator Challenge: Legends Collide 2
| 
|align=center|2
|align=center|2:42
| San Jacinto, California, United States
|Defended Gladiator Challenge Featherweight Championship.
|-
| Win
|align=center|12–3
| Randy Connelly
| TKO (punches)
| Gladiator Challenge: Season's Beatings 2
| 
|align=center|1
|align=center|0:12
| San Jacinto, California, United States
|Won Gladiator Challenge Featherweight Championship.
|-
| Win
|align=center|11–3
| Thomas Noel
| TKO (punches)
| Gladiator Challenge: Royal Flush
| 
|align=center|2
|align=center|1:27
| San Jacinto, California, United States
|Defended Gladiator Challenge Flyweight Championship.
|-
| Win
|align=center|10–3
| Xavier Strokes
| Submission
| Gladiator Challenge: Maximum Force
| 
|align=center|3
|align=center|4:39
| San Jacinto, California, United States
|Won Gladiator Challenge Flyweight Championship.
|-
| Win
|align=center|9–3
| Ben Champeaux
| TKO (punches)
| Gladiator Challenge: Vision Quest
| 
|align=center|1
|align=center|1:21
| San Jacinto, California, United States
|
|-
| Win
|align=center|8–3
| Rob Hawkes
| KO (punches)
| Gladiator Challenge: Never Quit
| 
|align=center|1
|align=center|0:10
| San Jacinto, California, United States
|
|-
| Loss
|align=center|7–3
| Landon Piercy
| Submission (choke) 
| Gladiator Challenge: High Impact
| 
|align=center|2
|align=center|4:41
| San Jacinto, California, United States
|
|-
| Win
|align=center|7–2
| Darrell Montague
| TKO (punches)
| Gladiator Challenge: Warriors
| 
|align=center|3
|align=center|2:55
| San Jacinto, California, United States
|
|-
| Win
|align=center|6–2
| Willie Gates
| TKO (punches)
| GC 85: Cross Fire
| 
|align=center|1
|align=center|3:50
| San Diego, California, United States
|
|-
| Win
|align=center|5–2
| Lorenzo Bencomo
| TKO (punches)
| MMAX 18: Going Home
| 
|align=center|1
|align=center|1:06
| Tijuana, Mexico
|
|-
| Win
|align=center|4–2
| Gil Aguilar
| TKO (punches) 
| MMA Xtreme 17
| 
|align=center|2
|align=center|0:40
| Choluteca, Honduras
|
|-
| Win
|align=center|3–2
| John Wallace
| KO (punches) 
| MMA Xtreme 14
| 
|align=center|2
|align=center|0:31
| Choluteca, Honduras
|
|-
| Loss
|align=center|2–2
| Fred Leavy
| Decision
| MMA Xtreme 12
| 
|align=center|3
|align=center|N/A
| Mexicali, Mexico
|
|-
| Win
|align=center|2–1
| Mauricio Castillo
| TKO (punches) 
| MMA Xtreme 11
| 
|align=center|1
|align=center|0:21
| Tijuana, Mexico
|
|-
| Win
|align=center|1–1
| John Wallace
| KO (punches) 
| MMA Xtreme 10
| 
|align=center|1
|align=center|0:53
| Santo Domingo, Dominican Republic
|
|-
| Loss
|align=center|0–1
| Yahir Reyes
| Submission (rear-naked choke)
| MMA Xtreme 9
| 
|align=center|1
|align=center|N/A
| Tijuana, Mexico
|

Bare knuckle record

|-
|Win
|align=center|3–0
|Martin Brown
|Decision (split)
|BKFC Fight Night: Jackson 2
|
|align=center|5
|align=center|2:00
|Jackson, Mississippi, United States
|
|-
|Win
|align=center|2–0
|Peter Petties	
|Decision (unanimous)
|BKFC Fight Night: Tampa
| 
|align=center|5
|align=center|2:00
|Tampa, Florida, United States
|
|-
|Win
|align=center|1–0
|Jay Cucciniello
|Decision (unanimous)
|World Bare Knuckle Fighting Federation
|
|align=center|5
|align=center|2:00
|Casper, Wyoming, United States
|
|-

See also
 List of current UFC fighters
 List of male mixed martial artists

References

External links
 
 

1986 births
Living people
Sportspeople from Escondido, California
American male mixed martial artists
American people of Honduran descent
Mixed martial artists from California
American sportspeople in doping cases
Doping cases in mixed martial arts
American male taekwondo practitioners
American practitioners of Brazilian jiu-jitsu
Featherweight mixed martial artists
Lightweight mixed martial artists
Mixed martial artists utilizing taekwondo
Mixed martial artists utilizing Brazilian jiu-jitsu
Ultimate Fighting Championship male fighters